In the fields of sociology, social ontology, and communication theory, social constructionism proposes that certain ideas about physical reality arise from collaborative consensus, instead of the pure observation of said physical reality. The theory of social constructionism proposes that people collectively develop the meanings (denotations and connotations) of social constructs. Social constructionism has been characterised as neo-Marxian theory and as a neo-Kantian theory, proposing that social constructionism replaces the transcendental subject with a societal concept that is descriptive and normative.

While some social constructs are obvious, for instance money or the concept of currency, in that people have agreed to give it importance/value, others are controversial and hotly debated, such as the concept of self/self-identity. This articulates the view that people in society construct ideas or concepts that may not exist without the existence of people or language to validate those concepts.

There is weak and strong social constructionism. Weak social constructionism relies on brute factsfacts that are not socially constructed, such as, arguably, facts about physical particlesor institutional facts (which are formed from social conventions). It has been objected that strong social constructionism undermines the foundation of science as the pursuit of objectivity, and as a theory defies any attempt at falsifying it.

Overview 
A social construct or construction is the meaning, notion, or connotation placed on an object or event by a society, and adopted by that society with respect to how they view or deal with the object or event.

Social constructionism posits that the meanings of phenomena do not have an independent foundation outside the mental and linguistic representation that people develop about them throughout their history, and which becomes their shared reality. From a linguistic viewpoint, social constructionism centres meaning as an internal reference within language (words refer to words, definitions to other definitions) rather than to an external reality.

Origins 

In the 16th century, Michel de Montaigne wrote that, "We need to interpret interpretations more than to interpret things." In 1886 or 1887, Friedrich Nietzsche put it similarly: "Facts do not exist, only interpretations." In his 1922 book Public Opinion, Walter Lippmann said, "The real environment is altogether too big, too complex, and too fleeting for direct acquaintance" between people and their environment. Each person constructs a pseudo-environment that is a subjective, biased, and necessarily abridged mental image of the world, and to a degree, everyone's pseudo-environment is a fiction. People "live in the same world, but they think and feel in different ones."  Lippman's "environment" might be called "reality", and his "pseudo-environment" seems equivalent to what today is called "constructed reality".

Social constructionism has more recently been rooted in "symbolic interactionism" and "phenomenology". With Berger and Luckmann's The Social Construction of Reality published in 1966, this concept found its hold. More than four decades later, much theory and research pledged itself to the basic tenet that people "make their social and cultural worlds at the same time these worlds make them." It is a viewpoint that uproots social processes "simultaneously playful and serious, by which reality is both revealed and concealed, created and destroyed by our activities." It provides a substitute to the "Western intellectual tradition" where the researcher "earnestly seeks certainty in a representation of reality by means of propositions."

In social constructionist terms, "taken-for-granted realities" are cultivated from "interactions between and among social agents"; furthermore, reality is not some objective truth "waiting to be uncovered through positivist scientific inquiry." Rather, there can be "multiple realities that compete for truth and legitimacy." Social constructionism understands the "fundamental role of language and communication" and this understanding has "contributed to the linguistic turn" and more recently the "turn to discourse theory". The majority of social constructionists abide by the belief that "language does not mirror reality; rather, it constitutes [creates] it."

A broad definition of social constructionism has its supporters and critics in the organizational sciences. A constructionist approach to various organizational and managerial phenomena appear to be more commonplace and on the rise.

Andy Lock and Tom Strong trace some of the fundamental tenets of social constructionism back to the work of the 18th-century Italian political philosopher, rhetorician, historian, and jurist Giambattista Vico.

Berger and Luckmann give credit to Max Scheler as a large influence as he created the idea of sociology of knowledge which influenced social construction theory.

According to Lock and Strong, other influential thinkers whose work has affected the development of social constructionism are: Edmund Husserl, Alfred Schutz, Maurice Merleau-Ponty, Martin Heidegger, Hans-Georg Gadamer, Paul Ricoeur, Jürgen Habermas, Emmanuel Levinas, Mikhail Bakhtin, Valentin Volosinov, Lev Vygotsky, George Herbert Mead, Ludwig Wittgenstein, Gregory Bateson, Harold Garfinkel, Erving Goffman, Anthony Giddens, Michel Foucault, Ken Gergen, Mary Gergen, Rom Harre, and John Shotter.

Applications

Personal construct psychology
Since its appearance in the 1950s, personal construct psychology (PCP) has mainly developed as a constructivist theory of personality and a system of transforming individual meaning-making processes, largely in therapeutic contexts. It was based around the notion of persons as scientists who form and test theories about their worlds. Therefore, it represented one of the first attempts to appreciate the constructive nature of experience and the meaning persons give to their experience. Social constructionism (SC), on the other hand, mainly developed as a form of a critique, aimed to transform the oppressing effects of the social meaning-making processes. Over the years, it has grown into a cluster of different approaches, with no single SC position. However, different approaches under the generic term of SC are loosely linked by some shared assumptions about language, knowledge, and reality.

A usual way of thinking about the relationship between PCP and SC is treating them as two separate entities that are similar in some aspects, but also very different in others. This way of conceptualizing this relationship is a logical result of the circumstantial differences of their emergence. In subsequent analyses these differences between PCP and SC were framed around several points of tension, formulated as binary oppositions: personal/social; individualist/relational; agency/structure; constructivist/constructionist. Although some of the most important issues in contemporary psychology are elaborated in these contributions, the polarized positioning also sustained the idea of a separation between PCP and SC, paving the way for only limited opportunities for dialogue between them.

Reframing the relationship between PCP and SC may be of use in both the PCP and the SC communities. On one hand, it extends and enriches SC theory and points to benefits of applying the PCP "toolkit" in constructionist therapy and research. On the other hand, the reframing contributes to PCP theory and points to new ways of addressing social construction in therapeutic conversations.

Educational psychology
Like social constructionism, social constructivism states that people work together to construct artifacts. While social constructionism focuses on the artifacts that are created through the social interactions of a group, social constructivism focuses on an individual's learning that takes place because of his or her interactions in a group.

Social constructivism has been studied by many educational psychologists, who are concerned with its implications for teaching and learning. For more on the psychological dimensions of social constructivism, see the work of Lev Vygotsky, Ernst von Glasersfeld and A. Sullivan Palincsar.

Systemic therapy
Some of the systemic models that use social constructionism include Narrative Therapy and Solution Focused Therapy

Crime 

Potter and Kappeler (1996), in their introduction to Constructing Crime: Perspective on Making News And Social Problems wrote, "Public opinion and crime facts demonstrate no congruence.  The reality of crime in the United States has been subverted to a constructed reality as ephemeral as swamp gas."

Criminology has long focussed on why and how society defines criminal behavior and crime in general. While looking at crime through a social constructionism lens, we see evidence to support that criminal acts are a social construct where abnormal or deviant acts become a crime based on the views of society. Another explanation of crime as it relates to social constructionism are individual identity constructs that result in deviant behavior. If someone has constructed the identity of a "madman" or "criminal" for themselves based on a society's definition, it may force them to follow that label, resulting in criminal behavior.

Communication studies

A bibliographic review of social constructionism as used within communication studies was published in 2016. It features an overview of resources from that disciplinary perspective The collection of essays published in Galanes and Leeds-Hurwitz (2009) should also be useful to anyone interested in how social construction actually works during communication. This collection was the result of a conference held in 2006, sponsored by the National Communication Association as a Summer institute, entitled "Catching ourselves in the Act: A Collaboration to Enrich our Discipline Through Social Constructionist Approaches". Briefly, the basic assumption of the group was that "individuals jointly construct (create) their understandings of the world and the meanings they give to encounters with others, or various products others create. At the heart of the matter is the assumption that such meanings are constructed jointly, that is, in coordination with others, rather than individually. Thus the term of choice most often is social construction." At that event, John Stewart in his keynote presentation, suggested it was time to choose a single term among the set then common (social constructionist, social constructivism, social constructivist), and proposed using the simpler form: social construction. Those present at the conference agreed to that use, and so that is the term most often used in this article, and by communication scholars since then. During discussion at the conference, participants developed a common list of principles:
 1. Communication is the process through which we construct and reconstruct social worlds.
 2. Communication is constitutive; communication makes things.
 3. Every action is consequential.
 4. We make things together. We construct the social worlds we share with others as relational beings.
 5. We perceive many social worlds existing simultaneously, and we continue to shape them. Other people's social worlds may be different from ours. What we inherit is not our identity.
 6. No behavior conveys meaning in and of itself. Contexts afford and constrain meanings.
 7. Ethical implications and consequences derive from Principles 1-6.

A survey of publications in communication relating to social construction in 2009 found that the major topics covered were: identity, language, narratives, organizations, conflict, and media.

History and development

Berger and Luckmann

Constructionism became prominent in the U.S. with Peter L. Berger and Thomas Luckmann's 1966 book, The Social Construction of Reality. Berger and Luckmann argue that all knowledge, including the most basic, taken-for-granted common sense knowledge of everyday reality, is derived from and maintained by social interactions. In their model, people interact on the understanding that their perceptions of everyday life are shared with others, and this common knowledge of reality is in turn reinforced by these interactions. Since this common sense knowledge is negotiated by people, human typifications, significations and institutions come to be presented as part of an objective reality, particularly for future generations who were not involved in the original process of negotiation. For example, as parents negotiate rules for their children to follow, those rules confront the children as externally produced "givens" that they cannot change. Berger and Luckmann's social constructionism has its roots in phenomenology. It links to Heidegger and Edmund Husserl through the teaching of Alfred Schutz, who was also Berger's PhD adviser.

Narrative turn
During the 1970s and 1980s, social constructionist theory underwent a transformation as constructionist sociologists engaged with the work of Michel Foucault and others as a narrative turn in the social sciences was worked out in practice. This particularly affected the emergent sociology of science and the growing field of science and technology studies. In particular, Karin Knorr-Cetina, Bruno Latour, Barry Barnes, Steve Woolgar, and others used social constructionism to relate what science has typically characterized as objective facts to the processes of social construction, with the goal of showing that human subjectivity imposes itself on those facts we take to be objective, not solely the other way around. A particularly provocative title in this line of thought is Andrew Pickering's Constructing Quarks: A Sociological History of Particle Physics. At the same time, social constructionism shaped studies of technologythe Sofield, especially on the social construction of technology, or SCOT, and authors as Wiebe Bijker, Trevor Pinch, Maarten van Wesel, etc. Despite its common perception as objective, mathematics is not immune to social constructionist accounts. Sociologists such as Sal Restivo and Randall Collins, mathematicians including Reuben Hersh and Philip J. Davis, and philosophers including Paul Ernest have published social constructionist treatments of mathematics.

Postmodernism

Within the social constructionist strand of postmodernism, the concept of socially constructed reality stresses the ongoing mass-building of worldviews by individuals in dialectical interaction with society at a time. The numerous realities so formed comprise, according to this view, the imagined worlds of human social existence and activity, gradually crystallized by habit into institutions propped up by language conventions, given ongoing legitimacy by mythology, religion and philosophy, maintained by therapies and socialization, and subjectively internalized by upbringing and education to become part of the identity of social citizens.

In the book The Reality of Social Construction, the British sociologist Dave Elder-Vass places the development of social constructionism as one outcome of the legacy of postmodernism. He writes "Perhaps the most widespread and influential product of this process [coming to terms with the legacy of postmodernism] is social constructionism, which has been booming [within the domain of social theory] since the 1980s."

Criticisms 
One criticism that has been leveled at social constructionism is that it generally ignores the contribution made by natural sciences or misuses them in social sciences. Most notably, social constructionists have been accused of using the term "society" in both a descriptive way and a normative way, thereby failing to provide adequate explanation as to what they mean by society, whether it be an ideological concept or a description of any historically located community.

As a theory, social constructionism rejects the influences of biology on behaviour and culture, or suggests that they are unimportant to achieve an understanding of human behaviour, while the scientific consensus is that behaviour is a complex outcome of both biological and cultural influences. Social constructionism has been criticized for having an overly narrow focus on society and culture as a causal factor in human behavior, excluding the influence of innate biological tendencies, by psychologists such as Steven Pinker in The Blank Slate as well as by Asian Studies scholar Edward Slingerland in What Science Offers the Humanities. John Tooby and Leda Cosmides used the term "standard social science model" to refer to social theories that they believe fail to take into account the evolved properties of the brain.

Social constructionism equally denies or downplays to a significant extent the role that meaning and language have for each individual, seeking to configure language as an overall structure rather than a historical instrument used by individuals to communicate their personal experiences of the world. This is particularly the case with cultural studies, where personal and pre-linguistic experiences are disregarded as irrelevant or seen as completely situated and constructed by the socio-economical superstructure.

In 1996, to illustrate what he believed to be the intellectual weaknesses of social constructionism and postmodernism, physics professor Alan Sokal submitted an article to the academic journal Social Text deliberately written to be incomprehensible but including phrases and jargon typical of the articles published by the journal. The submission, which was published, was an experiment to see if the journal would "publish an article liberally salted with nonsense if (a) it sounded good and (b) it flattered the editors' ideological preconceptions." In 1999, Sokal, with coauthor Jean Bricmont published the book Fashionable Nonsense, which criticized postmodernism and social constructionism.

Philosopher Paul Boghossian has also written against social constructionism. He follows Ian Hacking's argument that many adopt social constructionism because of its potentially liberating stance: if things are the way that they are only because of our social conventions, as opposed to being so naturally, then it should be possible to change them into how we would rather have them be. He then states that social constructionists argue that we should refrain from making absolute judgements about what is true and instead state that something is true in the light of this or that theory. Countering this, he states:

Woolgar and Pawluch argue that constructionists tend to "ontologically gerrymander" social conditions in and out of their analysis.

Alan Sokal also criticize social constructionism for contradicting itself on the knowability of the existence of societies. The argument is that if there was no knowable objective reality, there would be no way of knowing whether or not societies exist and if so, what their rules and other characteristics are. One example of the contradiction is that the claim that "phenomena must be measured by what is considered average in their respective cultures, not by an objective standard" since there are languages that have no word for average and therefore the whole application of the concept of "average" to such cultures contradict social constructionism's own claim that cultures can only be measured by their own standards.

See also

References

Further reading

Books
 Boghossian, P. Fear of Knowledge: Against Relativism and Constructivism. Oxford University Press, 2006. Online review: Fear of Knowledge: Against Relativism and Constructivism
 Berger, P. L. and Luckmann, T., The Social Construction of Reality : A Treatise in the Sociology of Knowledge (Anchor, 1967).
 Best, J. Images of Issues: Typifying Contemporary Social Problems, New York: Gruyter, 1989
 Burr, V. Social Constructionism, 2nd ed. Routledge 2003.
 Ellul, J. Propaganda: The Formation of Men's Attitudes. Trans. Konrad Kellen & Jean Lerner. New York: Knopf, 1965. New York: Random House/ Vintage 1973
 Ernst, P., (1998), Social Constructivism as a Philosophy of Mathematics; Albany, New York: State University of New York Press
 Galanes, G. J., & Leeds-Hurwitz, W. (Eds.). Socially constructing communication. Cresskill, NJ: Hampton Press, 2009.
 Gergen, K., An Invitation to Social Construction. Los Angeles: Sage, 2015 (3d edition, first 1999).
 Glasersfeld, E. von, Radical Constructivism: A Way of Knowing and Learning. London: RoutledgeFalmer, 1995.* Hacking, I., The Social Construction of What? Cambridge: Harvard University Press, 1999; 
 Hibberd, F. J., Unfolding Social Constructionism. New York: Springer, 2005. 
 Kukla, A., Social Constructivism and the Philosophy of Science, London: Routledge, 2000. 
 Lowenthal, P., & Muth, R. Constructivism. In E. F. Provenzo, Jr. (Ed.), Encyclopedia of the social and cultural foundations of education (pp. 177–179). Thousand Oaks, CA: Sage, 2008.
 McNamee, S. and Gergen, K. (Eds.). Therapy as Social Construction. London: Sage, 1992 .
 McNamee, S. and Gergen, K. Relational Responsibility: Resources for Sustainable Dialogue. Thousand Oaks, California: Sage, 2005. .
 Penman, R. Reconstructing communicating. Mahwah, NJ: Lawrence Erlbaum, 2000.
 Poerksen, B. The Certainty of Uncertainty: Dialogues Introducing Constructivism. Exeter: Imprint-Academic, 2004.
 Restivo, S. and Croissant, J., "Social Constructionism in Science and Technology Studies" (Handbook of Constructionist Research, ed. J.A. Holstein & J.F. Gubrium) Guilford, NY 2008, 213–229; 
 Schmidt, S. J., Histories and Discourses: Rewriting Constructivism. Exeter: Imprint-Academic, 2007.
 Searle, J., The Construction of Social Reality. New York: Free Press, 1995; .
 Shotter, J. Conversational realities: Constructing life through language. Thousand Oaks, CA: Sage, 1993.
 Stewart, J., Zediker, K. E., & Witteborn, S. Together: Communicating interpersonally – A social construction approach (6th ed). Los Angeles, CA: Roxbury, 2005.
 Weinberg, D. Contemporary Social Constructionism: Key Themes. Philadelphia, PA: Temple University Press, 2014.
 Willard, C. A., Liberalism and the Problem of Knowledge: A New Rhetoric for Modern Democracy Chicago: University of Chicago Press, 1996; .
 Wilson, D. S. (2005), "Evolutionary Social Constructivism". In J. Gottshcall and D. S. Wilson, (Eds.), The Literary Animal: Evolution and the Nature of Narrative. Evanston, IL, Northwestern University Press; . Full text

Articles
 Drost, Alexander. "Borders. A Narrative Turn – Reflections on Concepts, Practices and their Communication", in: Olivier Mentz and Tracey McKay (eds.), Unity in Diversity. European Perspectives on Borders and Memories, Berlin 2017, pp. 14–33.
 
 Mallon, R, "Naturalistic Approaches to Social Construction", The Stanford Encyclopedia of Philosophy, Edward N. Zalta (ed.).
 
 Shotter, J., & Gergen, K. J., Social construction: Knowledge, self, others, and continuing the conversation. In S. A. Deetz (Ed.), Communication Yearbook, 17 (pp. 3–33). Thousand Oaks, CA: Sage, 1994.

External links 

 
 

 

Communication theory
Consensus reality
Human behavior
Human communication
Social concepts
Social epistemology
Sociology of knowledge
Sociological theories
Allegations